The Wanneroo Agricultural Show, also known as the Wanneroo Show, is an agricultural show, held on the last Friday & Saturday of November each year. The show is organized by the Wanneroo Agricultural Society (Inc.) and is held in the City of Wanneroo, in the northern metropolitan area of Perth, where it has been traditionally held since the first show in 1909. Featuring numerous competitions in the areas of agriculture, arts and crafts, photography, cooking, art, beer and wine and horticulture as well as commercial attractions including rides, showbags and commercial stands, the Wanneroo Show has grown to attract 10,000 people a year.

History 
The first Wanneroo show was officially opened by John Forrest on 21 April 1909. Following a resolution of the Wanneroo Road Board on 7 November 1908;

"... that Members of the Board form themselves into a committee for the purpose of forming an Agricultural Society to promote a Show in the district" .

In the 24 April 1909 edition of the Western Mail, a report regarding the first Wanneroo Show appeared under the heading 'A Successful Display', and continued to describe events and activities that were part of the Show.

Among the invited guests attending the inaugural Wanneroo Show were Sir John and Lady Forrest accompanied by several other dignitaries from the Western Australian State Government.

There were cancellations in 1915–18 & 1940–45. 2020 will see a reduced show caused by COVID-19 pandemic.

The Modern Show 
Each year the Wanneroo Show showcases agricultural, horticultural and other associated industries available in the Wanneroo region.

Transport and parking 
The Shows increasing attraction and attendance has created new problems for the Wanneroo Showgrounds venue. Parking has become an increasing problem, with limited parking available at the Showgrounds. Car parking is available for show attendees off Ariti Avenue in the carpark outside the Showgrounds main gate, plus within the Showgrounds. Avoid parking on road verges around the Showgrounds or in areas adjacent to Yellagonga Regional Park. Parking within these locations is not permitted for show attendees, and the police will issue infringement notices to offenders.

Additional parking is available within the carpark located at the rear of the City of Wanneroo Administration Building (off Dundebar Road) with over 300 bays available. Extra carpark spaces are available throughout the Wanneroo Town Centre. A free shuttle bus operates from the City of Wanneroo Administration Building carpark to the showgrounds between 6:00pm to 10:30pm on Friday and 3:00 to 10:30pm on Saturday.

Shows and performances 
Stage shows, including singers, dancers, bands and a range of other performers, field events, displays, competitions and many other activities and attractions are available at the Wanneroo Show on Friday evening and all day Saturday.

Wanneroo Show Idol 
The Wanneroo Show Idol talent competition has become a tradition at the Show during recent years, with many talented entrants taking part and providing brilliant entertainment.

Showbags and sideshow alley 
The scope of the Show has also expanded. Although it includes traditional events – such as animal competitions – its agricultural focus has been somewhat replaced by a commercial fairground atmosphere.

The show offers a wide variety of showbags and rides within sideshow alley.

Exhibitions 
Each year the Margaret Cockman Pavilion plays host to numerous exhibits of produce and craft. There is also a children's section where a range of awards, prizes and trophies are awarded for the best exhibits in the various classes on display.

Wanneroo Agricultural Society 
The Wanneroo Agricultural Society, which is the organizing body for the show has been active since 1909 and was initially created in order to assist in developing the small community of agricultural growers.

The Wanneroo Agricultural Society has been organizing the show for more than 100 years, which was recognized in 2009 when the show was awarded Wanneroo community event of the year.

References

External links 
 The official homepage of the Wanneroo Agricultural Show

Agricultural shows in Australia
Wanneroo, Western Australia